has been a general authority of the Church of Jesus Christ of Latter-day Saints since 1977, and was the first native Asian to be called as a general authority of the Church.

Kikuchi was born on the island of Hokkaido. His father served in the military during the Second World War and was killed by an American torpedo while at sea.  Kikuchi was baptized a member of The Church of Jesus Christ of Latter-day Saints when he was taught the gospel as a teenager by American missionaries in the 1950s.  

As a young man, Kikuchi served as a full-time proselyting missionary in the Northern Far East Mission for two and a half years, and a labor missionary for an additional year.  He graduated in 1968 from Tokyo Asia University with a degree in Business Psychology and Management.  After completing his education, he worked as a regional manager for Rena-Ware Distributors Company for the entire Japan area, and eventually operated his own import export company.

During this time, Kikuchi was also continuing to serve in the LDS Church, including as president of one of the church's branches in Tokyo. When the Tokyo Stake, the first formed anywhere in Asia was organized, Kikuchi was called as first counselor in the stake presidency. He was later called as the president of the Tokyo Stake. In 1977, Kikuchi was called into full-time church service as a general authority. He became a seventy and member of the First Quorum of the Seventy at the church's October 1977 general conference.

Elder Kikuchi served as an Assistant Executive Director in the Temple Department, as president of the Asia North Area, and as a counselor in the North America Northeast, North America Northwest, North America Central, North America East, Utah North Area Presidencies, as well as Executive Administrator in the Asia North and Granger Murray Areas.

From 1987 to 1989, Kikuchi served as president of the church's Hawaii Honolulu Mission.  In 1987, Kikuchi was a keynote speaker at the first major African-American family history conference sponsored by the LDS Church. From 1994 to 1997, he served as president of the Tokyo Japan Temple. 

On October 1, 2011, Kikuchi was released from the First Quorum of the Seventy and designated as an emeritus general authority.

Kikuchi is married to former Toshiko Koshiya of Hokkaido, Japan.  They are the parents of four children.

Notes

References
Glenn N. Powe. "Yoshihiko Kikuchi" in Encyclopedia of Latter-day Saint History, Arnold K,. Garr, et al., ed. p. 606.

External links
General Authorities and General Officers: Elder Yoshihiko Kikuchi
Larry E. Morris, "Elder Yoshihiko Kikuchi: Steadfast amid Change", Liahona, August 1985.
"Elder Yoshihiko Kikuchi of the First Quorum of the Seventy", Ensign, November 1977.

1941 births
Converts to Mormonism
Japanese general authorities (LDS Church)
Japanese Mormon missionaries
Living people
Members of the First Quorum of the Seventy (LDS Church)
Mission presidents (LDS Church)
Mormon missionaries in Hawaii
People from Hokkaido
Temple presidents and matrons (LDS Church)
20th-century Mormon missionaries
Asia University (Japan) alumni